Theodore Richard Bolser (born October 22, 1990) is a former American football tight end. He was drafted by the Washington Redskins in the seventh round of the 2014 NFL Draft. He played college football at Indiana. He has also played for the Arizona Cardinals and Tampa Bay Buccaneers.

College career
Bolser was a four-year starter for the Indiana Hoosiers football team (2010-2013), first for head coach Bill Lynch and then for Kevin Wilson. In 47 games with the Hoosiers, he caught 117 passes for 1,337 yards and 15 touchdowns.

Professional career

Washington Redskins
Bolser signed a four-year contract with the Redskins on May 16, 2014. The Redskins released Bolser on August 29, 2014. After clearing waivers, he was signed to the team's practice squad, two days later. He was waived from the practice squad on October 7.

Tampa Bay Buccaneers
The Tampa Bay Buccaneers signed Bolser to their practice squad on November 3, 2014, but was released on November 26, 2014.

Arizona Cardinals
The Arizona Cardinals signed Bolser to their practice squad on December 30, 2014. He signed a futures contract with the Cardinals on January 5, 2015. On August 6, 2015, he was released by the Cardinals due to injury. A few days later, Bolser took to Twitter to announce that his injuries had forced him to retire from playing football.

References

External links
Arizona Cardinals bio
Indiana Hoosiers bio

1990 births
Living people
Players of American football from Cincinnati
American football tight ends
Indiana Hoosiers football players
Washington Redskins players
Tampa Bay Buccaneers players
Arizona Cardinals players